Jonathon "Jono" Beech (born 16 September 1990) is a former professional Australian rules footballer who played for the Adelaide Football Club in the Australian Football League (AFL).

SANFL career

Beech made his SANFL debut for West Adelaide in 2008. Beech is a strong-marking forward, who can also run through the midfield. Over the course of his SANFL career for West Adelaide he played 129 games and kicked 148 goals, also applying for the AFL draft 8 times but never being drafted by any AFL club. Once again, he was overlooked.

Beech was a member of West Adelaide's 2015 SANFL premiership team and kicked 35 goals in 2015 to finish eighth in the Ken Farmer Medal. He also averaged 18 possessions, seven marks, six score involvements and four inside 50s across 22 SANFL games. Beech ranked No.1 in the SANFL for total marks and third for contested marks. After this, Beech was drafted in the second round of the 2016 AFL rookie draft. He was Adelaide's second pick in the draft.

AFL career

Beech spent his entire first season playing for Adelaide's reserves team in the SANFL. He made his debut in the fifty-seven point win against  at Adelaide Oval in round twelve of the 2017 AFL season, in which he kicked his first AFL goal. He played three games for the Crows, but was dropped back into the SANFL in round sixteen. He was delisted by Adelaide at the conclusion of the 2017 season.

Statistics

 Statistics are correct to end of the 2017 season

|- style="background:#eaeaea;"
! scope="row" style="text-align:center" | 2016
| style=:text-align:center"|  
| 1 || 0 || — || — || — || — || — || — || — || — || — || — || — || — || — || —
|-
! scope="row" style="text-align:center" | 2017
| style=:text-align:center"|  
| 1 || 3 || 1 || 0 || 15 || 23 || 38 || 10 || 9 || 0.3 || 0.0 || 5.0 || 7.7 || 12.7 || 3.3 || 3.0
|- class="sortbottom"
! colspan=3| Career
! 3
! 1
! 0
! 15
! 23
! 38
! 10
! 9
! 0.3
! 0.0
! 5.0
! 7.7
! 12.7
! 3.3
! 3.0
|}

References

External links
 
 

1990 births
Adelaide Football Club players
Living people
Australian rules footballers from South Australia
West Adelaide Football Club players